Radiation Sickness is a VHS by the thrash metal band Nuclear Assault.  The video is a recording of a concert at the Hammersmith Odeon, London in 1987. It was released in 1991. Re-released on DVD in 2007.

Track listing
 "Betrayal"
 "Stranded In Hell"
 "Nuclear War"
 "Butt Fuck"
 "Justice"
 "My America"
 "Radiation Sickness" 
 "After The Holocaust"
 "Hang The Pope"
 "Lesbians" 
 "Vengeance"

Nuclear Assault video albums
Albums recorded at the Hammersmith Apollo